Indian Telly Award for Best Actor in a Comic Role – Male is an award given by Indiantelevision.com as part of its annual Indian Telly Awards for TV serials, to recognize a male actor who has delivered an outstanding performance in a comic role.

The award was first awarded in 2002. Since 2010, the award has been separated in two categories, Jury Award and Popular Award. Winner of Jury award is chosen by the jury of critics assigned to the function while Popular Award is given on the basis of public voting.

Superlatives

List of winners (Popular)

2000s 
2001 Not Awarded
2002 Pankaj Kapur - Office Office as Mussadi Lal
Suraj Thapar - Hum Saath Aath Hain as Ram
Vrajesh Hirjee - Yeh Hai Mumbai Meri Jaan as Hariprasad aka Harry
Varun Badola - Yeh Hai Mumbai Meri Jaan as  Balkrishna aka Balu
Mushtaq Khan - Tedhe Medhe Sapne
2003 Pankaj Kapur - Office Office as Mussadi Lal
Dilip Joshi - Shubh Mangal Savadhan as Dilip
Sanjay Mishra - Public Hai Sab Janti Hai as Public/Neta
Vineet Kumar - Ramkhilawan C.M. 'n' Family as Ramkhilawan
Gurpal Singh - Chuppa Rustam as Gurpaal
2004 Rajeev Mehta - Khichdi as Praful Parekh
Pankaj Kapur - Office Office as Mussadi Lal
Gaurav Gera - Jassi Jaissi Koi Nahin as Nandu
Anang Desai - Khichdi as Tulsidas Parekh
Sanjay Mishra - Public Hai Sab Janti Hai as Public/Neta
2005 Rajesh Kumar - Sarabhai vs Sarabhai as Rosesh Sarabhai
Rajeev Mehta - Instant Khichdi as Praful Parekh
Bakhtiyaar Irani - Batliwala House No. 43 as Shahrukh 
Satish Shah - Sarabhai vs Sarabhai as Indravardhan Sarabhai
Manoj Pahwa - Life Out Of Control as Gurpreet
2006 Satish Shah - Sarabhai vs Sarabhai as Indravardhan Sarabhai
Pankaj Kapur - Naya Office Office as Mussadi Lal
Varun Badola - Soni Mahiwal as Suresh
Cyrus Sahukar - Rendezvous With Semi Girebaal as Semi Girebal
Rajesh Kumar - Sarabhai vs Sarabhai as Rosesh Sarabhai
2007 Deven Bhojani - Baa Bahoo Aur Baby as Gopal "Gattu" Thakkar
Pankaj Kapur - Naya Office Office as Mussadi Lal
Varun Badola - Soni Mahiwal as Suresh 	
Rahul Lohani - Jabb Love Hua as Bhola
Dilip Rawal - Thodi Khushi Thode Gham as  Parag
2008 Deven Bhojani - Baa Bahoo Aur Baby as Gopal "Gattu" Thakkar
Rakesh Bedi - Yes Boss as Mohan Srivastava
Suraj Thapar - Kuchh Is Tara as Aditya Nanda
Sunil Grover - Kaun Banega Champu as Ruk Ruk Khan
2009 Dilip Joshi - Taarak Mehta Ka Ooltah Chashmah as Jethalal Gada
Deven Bhojani - Baa Bahoo Aur Baby as Gopal "Gattu" Thakkar
Sumeet Raghavan - Ghar Ki Baat Hai as Rajdeep Yagnik
Vivek Mushran - Bhaskar Bharti as Amarjeet Bhatia

2010s 

2010 Dilip Joshi - Taarak Mehta Ka Ooltah Chashmah as Jethalal Gada
Sumeet Raghavan - Sajan Re Jhoot Mat Bolo as Apoorva Shah
Swapnil Joshi - Papad Pol as Vinaychand
Rajeev Thakur - Sajan Re Jhoot Mat Bolo as Ishwar/Raju
Prasad Barve - Dill Mill Gayye as Dr. Jitendra Prasad
2011 No Award
2012 Dilip Joshi - Taarak Mehta Ka Ooltah Chashmah as Jethalal Gada
Paresh Ganatra - Chidiya Ghar as  Ghotak Narayan
Atul Parchure - R. K. Laxman Ki Duniya as Bhavesh Vasavda
Deven Bhojani - Mrs. Tendulkar as Suhas Tendulkar
Abbas Khan - Lapataganj as Pappu Pandey a.k.a. Biji Pandey
2013 Dilip Joshi - Taarak Mehta Ka Ooltah Chashmah as Jethalal Gada
Ali Asgar - Jeannie Aur Juju as Captain Vikram Khana aka Juju
Jeetu Shivhare - Chidiya Ghar as Gadha Prasad
Rohitash Gaud - Lapataganj as Mukundilal Sughandilal Gupta
Atul Parchure - R. K. Laxman Ki Duniya as Bhavesh Vasavda
2014 Kapil Sharma - Comedy Nights with Kapil as Kapil "Bitto" Sharma
Aamir Dalvi - Hum Ne Li Hai... Shapath as Senior-Inspector Kav
Rohitash Gaud - Lapataganj - Ek Baar Phir as Mukundi Lal Gupta
Dilip Joshi - Taarak Mehta Ka Ooltah Chashmah as Jethalal Gada
Krushna Abhishek - Comedy Circus Ke Mahabali
2015 Rohitash Gaud - Bhabi Ji Ghar Par Hai! as Manmohan Tiwari
Aashif Sheikh - Bhabi Ji Ghar Par Hai! as Vibhuti Narayan Mishra
Sumeet Raghavan - Badi Door Se Aaye Hain as Vasant Ghotala
Dilip Joshi - Taarak Mehta Ka Ooltah Chashmah as Jethalal Champaklal Gada
2016 No Award
2017 No Award
2018 No Award
2019 Rohitash Gaud - Bhabi Ji Ghar Par Hai! as Manmohan Tiwari
Aashif Sheikh - Bhabi Ji Ghar Par Hai! as Vibhuti Narayan Mishra
Dilip Joshi - Taarak Mehta Ka Ooltah Chashmah as Jethalal Champaklal Gada
2021 Rohitash Gaud - Bhabi Ji Ghar Par Hai! 
Dilip Joshi - Taarak Mehta Ka Ooltah Chashmah

Jury Award

2010s 
2010 Sumeet Raghavan - Sajan Re Jhoot Mat Bolo as Apoorva Shah
 (Nominations not available)
2011 No Award
2012 Rajesh Kumar - Chintu Chinki Aur Ek Badi Si Love Story as Dristhdumn Sarveshwar Sharma
Deven Bhojani - Mrs. Tendulkar as Suhas Tendulkar 
Paresh Ganatra - Chidiya Ghar as  Ghotak Narayan 
Dilip Joshi - Taarak Mehta Ka Ooltah Chashmah as Jethalal Gada
Rajendra Gupta - Chidiya Ghar as Kesari Narayan 
2013 Ali Asgar - Jeannie Aur Juju as Captain Vikram Khana aka Juju
Atul Parchure - R. K. Laxman Ki Duniya as Bhavesh Vasavda 
Dilip Joshi - Taarak Mehta Ka Ooltah Chashmah as Jethalal Gada
Gopi Bhalla - F.I.R. as Gopinath Gandotra
Shridhar Watsar- Baal Veer as Dooba Dooba
2014 Krushna Abhishek - Comedy Circus Ke Mahabali (tied with)  Rohitash Gaud - Lapataganj - Ek Baar Phir as Mukundi Lal Gupta 
Ali Asgar - Jeannie Aur Juju as Captain Vikram Khana aka Juju
Sanjay Chaudhary - Lapataganj - Ek Baar Phir as Chukundilal Mukundial Gupta
Sudesh Lehri - Comedy Circus Ke Mahabali
2015 Not Awarded
2019 Dilip Joshi - Taarak Mehta Ka Ooltah Chashmah as Jethalal Gada
2021 Dilip Joshi - Taarak Mehta Ka Ooltah Chashmah

References

Indian Telly Awards